The Nipissis River (French: Rivière Nipissis) is a river in the Côte-Nord region of Quebec, Canada, a tributary of the Moisie River. It is a recognized salmon river. The river is known for its steep cliffs, which provide a challenging ice-climbing environment.

Location

The Nipissis River is in the unorganized territory of Rivière-Nipissis in the Sept-Rivières Regional County Municipality.
Tributaries include the Wacouno and Nipisso rivers, both of which enter the from the left.
The proposed Moisie River Aquatic Reserve would include the Nipissis River and a narrow strip along its shores.

The Wacouno River joins the Nipissis to the west of Lake Nipisso.
It runs south from the Lake Fournier region.
The McDonald River joins the Nipissis not far from its mouth at the Chute McDonald, or McDonald Falls.

Name

Jean-Baptiste-Louis Franquelin in 1699 followed René Bélanger in calling the river the Petit Saguenay.
During the period of Camp-Adams and the Moisie-Salmon-Club the section of the Mipissis River between the Moisie River and the McDonald Falls was called the Moisie East Branch, and the Moisie upstream of the junction with the Nipisso was called the Moisie West Branch.
The river's present name was used by the surveyor Vincent in 1892.
Father Lemoine in 1906 wrote that Nipissis was a "lake covered in water lilies", but the Dictionnaire des rivières et lacs de la province de Québec (1914 and 1925) says the Innu name means "small sheet of water" or "small stream".

Fishing

A fish ladder was added to the McDonald Falls in 1975 to make the passage easier.
In February 2019 the council of the Uashat mak Mani-Utenam band formally took possession of the Moisie-Nipissis outfitter at the mouth of the Nipissis, with its sixteen salmon pits.
The government of Quebec paid the purchase cost based on an agreement reached with the Innu the previous year.
The Innu were considering some changes to the operation.

Ice climbing

In 1994 during a cross-country ski traverse Patrice Beaudet discovered that the Nipissis area had exceptional ice climbing lines.
The mur du 51, as the railwaymen call it, has an extraordinary concentration of cliffs and ice cascades.
Beaudet returned repeatedly and climbed lines such as Le Filon (III WI5) and Le Chercheur D'or (III WI5+).

The area may be reached by train or helicopter from Sept-Îles.
Tshiuetin Rail Transportation runs a passenger train between Sept Îles and Schefferville, and will drop off and pick up passengers at their choice of location.
Tracks in the region are usually passable from early December until the end of March.
The dense boreal forest makes travelling on land difficult, but in the winter the Nipissis River freezes over, and provides a practical route for travelling and camping.
The sites on the west bank of the river are hard to access due to deep snow, thick woods and difficult terrain.
Although the surface is frozen, the river is tumultuous and the ice may break.

Railway

The Quebec North Shore and Labrador Railway, which runs up the Moisie River valley from the south, follows the Nipissis to the Wacouno, then runs along the Wacouno valley towards Fermont.
In August 2019 The Moisie River Protection Association (MRPA) commissioned the National Institute of Scientific Research to study the impact of the railway on survival of salmon eggs in the Nipissis River, and to provide recommendations. 
The question is whether the vibrations from the average of 12 trains along the valley cause increased mortality.

Lakes

Lakes in the Nipissis watershed include:

Notes

Citations

Sources

Rivers of Côte-Nord